Goverdhan Reddy aka Govi is an Indian film director who works mainly in Telugu cinema. He is known for his work from the films Love You Bangaram and bilingual Telugu Tamil film Nayaki.

Early life

Director Govi aka Goverdhan Reddy before coming into film industry completed his education in the field of law (LLB). He enrolled as advocate  and later on due to his movie interest he went on to direct a short film called Drishti in 2004. He choose the theme of urban based domestic workers abuse and interviewed about 500 of them it was inaugurated by late Y. S. Rajasekhara Reddy and screened at Ravindrabharathi in Hyderabad. Later National Domestic Workers Movement(NDWM) screened it at a gathering of 3000 domestic workers, who instantly connected with the theme. Drishti went on to become critically acclaimed movie. National Domestic Workers Movement(NDWM) later on bought the rights for the movie from him. Later on Director Govi did few more short films based on social issues.

Career

Director Govi  aka Goverdhan Reddy released his first Telugu language short film Drishti (2004) was released at Ravindra Bharathi. His first feature film Love You Bangaram under Creative Commercials and Maruthi Talkies banners. The film has Rahul Haridas, Shravya in the lead roles. His second film was horror comedy bilingual film Nayaki starring top heroine Trisha released in Tamil and Telugu by July 2016.

Filmography

References

External links 

Living people
21st-century Indian film directors
Telugu film directors
Film directors from Telangana
Year of birth missing (living people)